Yuan-Sheng Tsai (born 1969), is a Taiwanese artist born in Taipei. Fascinated by painting since childhood, Tsai set off to study in Spain in 1996 after obtaining a fine art background in Taiwan. His overseas experience acted as a creative turning point because of the influence from well-known Spanish masterpieces. In both Taiwan and Spain, Tsai has been awarded several representative art prizes. During 1996 to 2006, he completed further fine art studies – a Master's of Arts and PhD in Spain.

Art characteristics 
Much of Tsai's work is inspired by music. He utilizes numerous types of pigments and even uses his own hand-made pigments. The overlapping and intricate elements in his works are akin to the hundreds of storyboards for a film.

Works 
 《Twittering》, 91x116.5cm, Oil on canvas, 2011
 《Always Moonish》, 78.5x216cm, Oil on board, 2011
 《Had Much Gray!》, 150x122cm, Oil on board, 2011
 《La nostalgia y la distancia》, 90.5x116.5cm, Oil on canvas, 2011

See also
Taiwanese art

References

Sources 
 Yuan-Sheng Tsai, "Wondering on the Border, Yuan-Sheng", Zhen Yiang Publishing, Taipei, 2000.
 Powen Gallery 

1969 births
Living people
Taiwanese expatriates in Spain
Taiwanese painters
National Taiwan University of Arts alumni